Delaware and Hudson Railroad Bridge is a pair of historic Warren Steel Truss bridges over the Ausable River at AuSable and Peru in Clinton County, New York.  Also known as the Delaware and Hudson Ausable River Bridge, they were built by the American Bridge Company for the Delaware and Hudson Railway in 1913.  The North Bridge is 156 feet in length and the South Bridge 173 feet.  They are both 16 feet wide and 25 feet in height.

It was listed on the National Register of Historic Places in 1999.

References

Railroad bridges on the National Register of Historic Places in New York (state)
Bridges completed in 1913
Railroad bridges in New York (state)
Bridges in Clinton County, New York
1913 establishments in New York (state)
National Register of Historic Places in Clinton County, New York
Steel bridges in the United States
Warren truss bridges in the United States